Uaitemuri is a genus of Brazilian cribellate orb-weavers first described by A. J. Santos & M. O. Gonzaga in 2017.  it contains only two species.

References

External links

Araneomorphae genera
Uloboridae